Maanavan is a 1970 Tamil-language film directed by M. A. Thirumugam and produced by Sandow M. M. A. Chinnappa Thevar under Dhandayudhapani Films. The script were written by Balamurugan. The film starring Jaishankar and Muthuraman with Sowcar Janaki, Lakshmi, Nagesh and Sachu in supporting roles. Kamal Haasan appears only for a dance sequence along with Kutty Padmini. This was Haasan's first adult role after a seven-year hiatus. The film also marks the debut of many character actors and comedians like Pandu, Kathadi Ramamurthy among others.

Plot 
Kathiresan is the son of Parvathi, a maid at the Panchayat president's (O.A.K.Thevar) house and her husband (S.A.Ashokan) is a cattle herder. In a fight about gambling debts, his father kills a man and runs away with the police on his tail. He is later found and sent to jail for life imprisonment. Ravi, the son of Panchayat president of Salaiyur village in Chengapattu District, is Kathiresan's classmate. Ravi bullies Kathiresan and is not good in studies, while Kathiresan excels in it. Being jealous of this, the Panchayat president wants Kathiresan to quite studies and be a cattle herder. But Parvathi is intent on Kathiresan being educated and relocates to Madras. She becomes a maid in a school and a worker in a rice mill. With great difficulty Kathiresan studies well and get admitted to a college. To help pay his fees, he works as a Cycle Rickshaw puller on the side.

Ravi, who grew up to be a playboy, is enrolled in the same college as Kathiresan. 
Kathiresan and Shanthi, who is the college-going daughter of Judge Satyamurthy, fall in love with each other. He passes his M.A in distinction and gets a job as a lecturer in the same college while preparing for his IAS entrance exams, which Ravi dislikes. Ravi finally gets dismissed from college due to his bad behavior. In revenge, he kills a student, Mani, and frames it on Kathiresan.

Ravi is ultimately found responsible for the murder and sent to the same jail as Kathiresan's father for life imprisonment. Kathiresan becomes an IAS officer and ends up coming to the same jail for inspection.

Kathiresan's father is released from jail and learns that his son is now an IAS officer. Ravi's father tries to assassinate Kathiresan with a bomb at a village function but is saved by Kathiresan. They are all reunited.

The comedy track is provided by Ramu (a rickshaw puller turned car driver) and his lover.

Cast 

Jaishankar as Kathiresan
R. Muthuraman as Ravi
Lakshmi as Shanthi
Nagesh as Ramu
S.A. Ashokan as Kathiresan's father
Sowkar Janaki as Parvathy
 Major Sundararajan as Judge Satyamurthy
 V. S. Raghavan as College principal
 O. A. K. Thevar as Ravi's father / Panchayat president
 Sachu as Ramu's wife
Master Prabhakar as Young ravi
 Sandow M. M. A. Chinnappa Thevar
 Senthamarai as School teacher
 Thengai Srinivasan as Mayandi
 Pandu as Dimki
 Kathadi Ramamurthy as Ravi's friend
 T. K. S. Natarajan as Bus passenger
 Vellai Subbaiah as Student
 Jayakumari
Master Krishnakumar as Young kathiresan
Radhabhai

Guest appearances in the song "Visiladichan Kunjugala"
Kamal Haasan as Student
Kutty Padmini as Student

Soundtrack 
Music was by Shankar–Ganesh and lyrics were written by Vaali, Tirchy Thyagarajan and Mariappa.

Release and reception 
Maanavan was released on 10 July 1970. The Indian Express called it "obviously an attempt to educate the students to be on their best behaviour". The reviewer praised the performances of the actors, saying Sowkar Janaki "stands out amongst the cast" while Muthuraman "puts in a breezy performance".

References

External links 

1970 films
1970s Tamil-language films
Films about educators
Films about the education system in India
Films directed by M. A. Thirumugam
Films scored by Shankar–Ganesh
Films set in Chennai
Films set in schools
Indian black-and-white films
Indian coming-of-age films
Indian drama films
Indian satirical films